The name Murlo cowboy is applied to a set of more than a dozen Etruscan acroteria from the sixth century BCE held at the museum of the Poggio Civitate at Murlo in the Province of Siena, Tuscany, Italy.

The major piece of the group is a seated terracotta statue with a wide-brimmed hat reminiscent of a cowboy hat. The statue probably represents a haruspex.

On Etruscan buildings, statues of gods, heroes, or ancestors were often placed on the ridges of roofs to protect votive offerings.

References

Bibliography 
 'The Murlo Cowboy: problems of reconstruction and interpretation' in Deliciae Fictiles, ed. Eva Rystedt, Charlotte Wikander and Örjan Wikander (Acta Instituti Romani Regni Sueciae, series in 4°, vol. 50, Stockholm, 1993) p. 117–121.

Archaeological museums in Italy
Etruscan art
Murlo